Karolina Riemen (born 19 August 1988) is a Polish freestyle skier, specializing in ski cross, and a former alpine skier.

Riemen competed at the 2010 Winter Olympics for Poland. She placed 26th in the qualifying round in ski cross, to advance to the knockout stages. She finished second in her first round heat to make the quarterfinals. She then finished fourth in her quarterfinal race, and did not advance.

As of April 2013, her best finish at the World Championships is 6th, in 2011.

Riemen made her World Cup debut in January 2008. Her best World Cup overall finish in ski cross is 11th, in 2012/13.

World Cup Podiums

References

External links
  (freestyle)
  (alpine)
 
 
 
 

1988 births
Living people
Polish female freestyle skiers
Olympic freestyle skiers of Poland
Freestyle skiers at the 2010 Winter Olympics
Freestyle skiers at the 2014 Winter Olympics
People from Tatra County
Sportspeople from Lesser Poland Voivodeship